Scott Matheson may refer to:
Scott Milne Matheson Sr. (1897–1958), US Attorney for Utah 1949–1953
Scott M. Matheson (1929–1990) son of the above, governor of Utah 1977–1985
Scott Matheson Jr. (born 1953) son of the above, US Attorney for Utah from 1993–1997, currently a judge on the 10th United States Circuit Court